Chhachhrauli is a tehsil and Gram Panchayat town consisting of 20 wards in Yamuna Nagar district in the state of Haryana, India. It is 11 km north-east of Jagadhari. Chachhraulli is often known as "Cherapunjii of Haryana" as it receives the most rain in the whole of Haryana 
. (The average for Haryana is 450mm in monsoon and Chachhraulli receives 1100 mm.) It was a municipal committee until 1998. Before independence in 1947, it was the capital of the princely state of Kalsia. The origin of word Chhachhrauli is believed to be "Sat Sherawali" due to a temple located near bus terminus.

Chhachhrauli has two areas: 
Khadar is a low lying area near the banks of the Yamuna River. The population is predominantly Hindu Gujjars. It has fertile lands for agriculture, often struck by floods. Average rainfall is 1050 mm. Khadar is also knows as Gujjar Land in Yammunagar district due to large number of Gurjar's
Ghaad is a high elevated area near shivalik hills. The population is predominantly Muslim. In this region Gujjars are found in both hindu and muslims and there are some jaat villages also. Land here is sandy which is not fertile for agriculture . Weather here is extreme. Very hot in summers and very cold in winters . Average rainfall is about 1200 mm. Highest in Haryana , due to Shiwalik hills

Geography
Chhachhrauli is very near to the boundaries of Uttar Pradesh, Himachal and Uttarakhand. It is surrounded by the historical Gurudwara Of Paonta Shahib, mythical Kapal Mochan (Bilaspur) and the well-known Panchmukhi Hanuman Temple. It is believed that the five Pandava brothers worshiped for some time after having won the Kurukshetra battle in Mahabharata.

Chhachhrauli has a big grain market (Anaj Mandi) where farmers from the surrounding areas bring their agricultural produce for ale. It is the hub of many villages like Singhpura, Sherpur, Chuharpur Khurd, Urjani, Yaqub Pur, Dasaura, Harauli and Pipli Majra. On the Chhachhrauli - Paunta Sahib road, Balachor, Panjeto, Mukarib Pur, Manakpur on the Chhachhrauli-Jagadhari road, Ganauli, Ganaula, Chholi Basatiyavala on the Chhachhrauli- Bilaspur road.

Nearby attraction
Nearby attractions are:
 Shivalik Fossil Park
 Adi Badri (Haryana) at Somb river which is stretch of Sarasvati river emerging out of Shivalik hills, has Sarasvati kund and Adi Badri Museum to the west of Somb river, Adi Badri temple inside the bend of Somb river to the west, Badrinath temple to the south and east of the bend of Somb river, Mantra Devi temple to the east of Somb river, Adi Badri Buddhist stupa near Rampur Gainda village
 Kalesar National Park
 Dadupur barrage at the confluence of Western Yamuna Canal, Somb river and Boli river
 Tajewala Barrage to divert Yamuna river into Western Yamuna Canal
 Hathnikund Barrage is newer barrage to replace the Tajewal Barrage
 Kapal Mochan near Bilaspur, Haryana is a Hindu pilgrimage site that also houses historic Gurdwara Kapal Mochan that was visited by Guru Nanak

History
Chhachhrauli was earlier the capital of Kalsia State created by Jat king Gurbaksh Singh in 1763, and had two Tehsils outside Chhachhrauli, namely Dera Basi (near Chandigarh) and Kalsia (near Amritsar). Kalsia State was one of the eight states in Punjab which formed PEPSU after Independence in 1947. Later, it was merged with Punjab and, in 1966, with Haryana.

Chhachhrauli Fort
Chhachhrauli Fort was built by the Raja of the erstwhile Kalsia state. The fort here earlier housed the state departments, including the state treasury and Tosh-i-Khana, and with a Dewan-Khana for official meetings, darbars and functions of the Raja Kalsia. It still has a clock tower occupying a prominent place in the fort area. The fort also houses "Ravi Mahal" and "Janak Niwas". The fort is in ruins.

Education
Government Senior Secondary School, which was upgraded from high school. During the earlier period of its history it was called M.K.High School (Meredith Kalsia High School) named after the Senior British Official of Ambala District during the British period who was invited to lay the foundation stone of the building of the School in 1912. The school was opened by Lt. Col. G.M.Dallas, I.A.C.S.I, Commissioner and Pol. Agent on 21 December 1915. The school has celebrated its 100th anniversary on 21 December 2015.

The Haryana State Government started a Government College a few years ago and the college now has its own new building. The classes are being held in this new building for the past few years. Chhachhrauli also has a separate Government Senior Secondary School for Girls which functions from within the premises of the Diwan-Khana situated in the Fort of the erstwhile Kalsia State. These educational facilities are being found most useful not only by the local population but also by the large rural population surrounding the town.

Demographics
 India census, Chhachhrauli had a population of 9720. Males constitute 51% of the population and females 49%. Chhachhrauli has an average literacy rate of 70%, higher than the national average of 59.5%; with male literacy of 75% and female literacy of 65%. 13% of the population is under 6 years of age.

See also 
 Adi Badri
 Amadalpur
 Buria
 Chaneti Buddhist Stupa
 Kapal Mochan
 Sugh Ancient Mound

References

Cities and towns in Yamunanagar district